Oxford University Cricket Club (OUCC), which represents the University of Oxford, has always held first-class status since 1827 when it made its debut in the inaugural University Match between OUCC and Cambridge University Cricket Club (CUCC).  It was classified as a List A team in 1973 only. Home fixtures are played at the University Parks slightly northeast of Oxford city centre.

History

The earliest reference to cricket at Oxford is in 1673. OUCC made its known debut in the inaugural University Match between Oxford and Cambridge played in 1827. In terms of extant clubs being involved, this is the oldest major fixture in the world: i.e., although some inter-county fixtures are much older, none of the current county clubs were founded before 1839 (the oldest known current fixture is Kent versus Surrey).

The Magdalen Ground was used for the University Cricket Club's first match in 1829, and remain in regular use until 1880. Bullingdon Green was used for two matches in 1843. The University Parks became the home ground of OUCC in 1881, when the Master of Pembroke, Evan Evans obtaining a lease on 10 acres of land there. The pavilion was designed by Thomas G. Jackson, architect of many nineteenth- and early twentieth-century Oxford buildings, including the university's Examination Schools. The building has three gables, the central one containing the clock, and is topped by a cupola and weather-vane. The pavilion contains a Long Room. The two ends of the pitch are the Pavilion End and the Norham Gardens End.

The University Match is now the club's sole first-class fixture each season.  Apart from this annual game, played in late June or early July, OUCC operates as part of the Oxford University Centre of Cricketing Excellence (UCCE), which includes Oxford Brookes University. The UCCE was rebranded as Oxford MCC University (MCCU) prior to the 2010 season. The University Match is the only one in which a true OUCC team takes part: i.e., composed entirely of current Oxford students.

The Oxford University Centre of Cricketing Excellence (OUCCE) team played 26 first-class matches (not including one abandoned) from 2001 to 2009. As Oxford Marylebone Cricket Club University, the team has played sixteen first-class matches from 2010 to 2016.

Grounds
The five grounds that Oxford University have used for home first-class and List A matches since 1829 are listed below, with statistics complete through to the end of the 2014 season.  Only the first-class and List A matches played at the ground by Oxford University are recorded in the table.

See also
List of Oxford University CC players

References

External links
Cricket in the Parks
MCC Universities information & history

 
1827 establishments in England
Cricket
Cricket in Oxfordshire
English cricket in the 19th century
Former senior cricket clubs
Sports clubs established in 1827
Student cricket in the United Kingdom
University of Oxford-related lists